Mahonia annamica is a shrub in the  Berberidaceae described as a species in 1908. It is endemic to Vietnam.

References

annamica
Endemic flora of Vietnam
Plants described in 1908